The Hyundai Super truck (hangul:현대 슈퍼트럭) is a line of heavy-duty commercial vehicle manufactured by Hyundai Motor Company from 1999 or 2001. The range was primarily available in cargo and dump truck. Its model truck name is 'Hyundai', but In USA and Canada market the brand name is 'Bering'. 

Most heavy-duty truck models are distinguishable by a front 'Hyundai Truck' badge, but the common Hyundai and badge is usually used on the rear.

In North America, Japan, Asia-Pacific, Mid-East, Africa, South America, its principal competitors are Bering HDMX, Daewoo Novus, Daewoo Chasedae Truck, Samsung Big Thumb(Also known as the S350/S250).

Models
Hyundai Super Truck is a name used by Hyundai Motor Company in commercial vehicle of trucks for more related models. a cargo truck & dump truck, Designed by Hyundai Motor Company and Bering Truck. Manufacture period: 1997–2004. Rebadged by Bering HDMX.
8 ton Cargo
8.5 ton Cargo
9.5 ton cargo
11 ton Cargo
11.5 ton Cargo
12 ton Cargo
13 ton Cargo
14 ton Cargo
15 ton Cargo
16 ton cargo
17 ton Cargo
18 ton Cargo
19 ton Cargo
19.5 ton Cargo
22 ton cargo
22.5 ton Cargo
23 ton Cargo
23.5 ton Cargo
25 ton Cargo
8 ton Dump
11 ton Dump
15 ton Dump
23 ton Dump
24 ton Dump
6x2 Mixer
8x4 Mixer
6x2 Tractor
6x4 Tractor

Super Truck
Rear-wheel-drive vehicles